Horizontes da Memória (lit. Horizons of Memory) was a Portuguese historical documentary television series about the History of Portugal. As of 2023, it airs on RTP Memória.

References

External links
 

Portuguese documentary television series
Rádio e Televisão de Portugal original programming